Petra Desert Marathon is a marathon and ultra half marathon (22.3 km) that took place for the first time on Saturday, September 26, 2009. The race is run in and around the ancient city of Petra in Jordan.

Petra, the "Rose City", was the capital of the Nabataean dynasty and lies hidden among the rugged cliffs of the Jordanian desert. The ancient city is a UNESCO World Heritage Site. Petra Desert Marathon is a part of the extreme marathon series hosted by Adventure Marathon. The course of the race is more challenging than average marathons because of the many steep ascents and descents.

See also
 Adventure running

References

External links 
 Official website

Marathons in Jordan